Pratham Kadam Phool is a 1969 Bengali film, written and directed by Inder Sen, based on the story of the same name, by Achintya Kumar Sengupta. It stars Tanuja and Soumitra Chatterjee in the lead. The film produced by Dipangshu Kumar Deb, and edited by Arabinda Bhattacharya.

Plot
Sukanta meets Kakali in a library reading room and discovers his passion for her, though she rejects him initially. Pranta's wife, Sukanta's sister in law, has suspected the truth yet she does not dare to encourage the affair since Sukanta is not established. On another day, both Kakali and Sukanta become stranded in a lift of the library for long hours for want of power. Here, they come closer to each other, and they start meeting frequently here and there. Once, they enjoy a picnic together along with the friends of Sukanta. One day Sukanta comes to the house of Kakali, but her parents do not approve of her. After a long interval, Sukanta meets Baren, his school friend, who is now very well off. Baren works in a European firm in a high post. He has his own four-wheeler and a handsome flat where he stays with his widowed mother. When Sukanta visits her, Baren's mother expresses her wish to give her son a pleasant bride. Kakali, one day, comes to the house of Sukanta. Her maiden appearance moved every single member of Sukanta's family. In fact, the mother of Sukanta wants them to marry. The parents of Kakali refuse. So Kakali left the house and property of her father. Kakali joins Baren as a receptionist. And trouble starts in Sukanta's family. Sukanta the research scholar misjudges the relation of Kakali and Baren. Kakali leaves one day after a heated exchange. The nephew of Sukanta, who loves his aunt, misses her. He goes missing. In the meantime, Baren hears about everything from Kakali and he takes the initiative to solve it. Ultimately Kakali comes to the police station, where a happy reunion takes place.

Cast

Soumitra Chatterjee as Sukanto Basu
Tanuja as Kakoli Mitra 
Subhendu Chatterjee as Baren
Chhaya Devi as Sukanto's Mother
Shamit Bhanja as Bhajahari Manna (singer in Picnic)
Subrata Chatterjee as Sukanto's sister in law
Anubha Gupta as Sukanto's aunt
Padmadevi as Baren's mother (as Padma Devi)
Sadhana Roychoudhury as Kakoli's mother 
Tarun Kumar Chatterjee as Prashanta (Sukanto's brother)
Shailen Mukherjee as Sukanto's father
Ajit Banerjee
Mihir Bhattacharya
Bhanu Banerjee as Servant (Kakoli's home)
Simantini Roy
Raktim Ghoshal
Fakir Das Kumar
Rajlakshmi Devi
Tushar Majumdar
Prabir Roy

Soundtrack
The film's soundtrack has been scored by Sudhin Dasgupta and three out of four songs were written by him. Pulak Banerjee wrote the song "Ami Shri Shri Bhojohori Manna". All the song playback by Asha Bhosle and Manna Dey.

References

External links

1969 films
Bengali-language Indian films
1960s Bengali-language films
Films based on Indian novels
Indian drama films
1969 drama films
Films scored by Sudhin Dasgupta